This is a list of people who have held the position of Superintendent of Public Instruction of Wisconsin. Partisan affiliation is indicated by shading for superintendents elected prior to 1902, when partisan elections for this office were ended. Since 1902, state superintendents have been elected on a nonpartisan basis with no affiliation on the ballot; thusly, a state superintendent is not allowed to affiliate with a political party during his or her time in office. However, an individual elected or appointed to the office of state superintendent may be a member of a political party before and after their time in office.  For example, Herbert J. Grover and Charles P. Cary both held prior partisan legislative or county office whereas Tony Evers ran for and won a partisan governor's race.

Notes

References 

Public Instruction